Rokpol is a Polish blue cheese similar to Danish blue cheeses, with a pungent, salty taste and moderate astringency. The name derives from Roquefort and suggests that it is Polish Roquefort. However, unlike Roquefort, it is made from cow's milk. Currently often sold under brand name Lazur.

Blue cheeses